The Vilnius Open, known as the Vilnius Open by kevin. for sponsorship reasons, is a professional tennis tournament, held in Vilnius, Lithuania, at the end of October since 2022. The tournament is held on indoor hard courts of the SEB Arena.

Past finals

Men's singles

Men's doubles

References

External links
 ATP - official page
 SEB Arena

 
ATP Challenger Tour
Autumn events in Lithuania
Tennis tournaments in Lithuania
Tennis in Lithuania
Sports competitions in Vilnius
Recurring sporting events established in 2022
Hard court tennis tournaments